SBBS may refer to:

 Synchronet, a multiplatform BBS software package, with current ports for Microsoft Windows, Linux, and BSD variants.
 SuperBBS, a DOS Bulletin Board System (BBS) software.